Vyazmino is a rural locality (a village) in Andreyevskoye Rural Settlement, Alexandrovsky District, Vladimir Oblast, Russia. The population was 38 as of 2010. There are 2 streets.

Geography 
Vyazmino is located 14 km southeast of Alexandrov (the district's administrative centre) by road. Maloye Marinkino is the nearest rural locality.

References 

Rural localities in Alexandrovsky District, Vladimir Oblast